A unit train, also called a block train or a trainload service, is a train in which all cars (wagons) carry the same commodity and are shipped from the same origin to the same destination, without being split up or stored en route. 
They are distinct from wagonload trains, which comprise differing numbers of cars for various customers.

Unit trains enable railways to compete more effectively with road and internal waterway transport systems. Time and money is saved by avoiding the complexities and delays that would otherwise be involved with assembling and disassembling trains at rail yards near the origin and destination. Unit trains are particularly efficient and economical for high-volume commodities. Since they often carry only one commodity, cars are of all the same type; often the cars are identical.

Use 
Unit trains are typically used for the transportation of bulk goods. These can be solid substances such as:
 Track ballast or gravel
 Iron ore from mines to ports or steel mills
 Coal from mines to power stations
 Coke from coking plants to steel mills
 Phosphate from mines to fertilizer plants
 Ore
 Steel
 Potash
 Taconite
 Aggregate
 Sand for hydraulic fracturing

Bulk liquids are transported in unit trains made up of tank cars, such as:
 Crude oil from oil fields to refineries (can be [] of oil in a unit train of 100 tank cars)
 Mineral oil products from the refineries to the storage facilities
 Ethanol from ethanol plants to motor fuel blending facilities
 Molten sulfur (non-US:sulphur)

Food, such as:
 Wheat
 Corn
 Fruit juice 
 Refrigerated food

Other examples include:
 Intermodal containers, generally between a port and a truck depot
 Cars in autoracks
 Military Equipment (weapons)
 Waste (garbage), usually for recycling, often metals or paper
 Mail
 TOFC

See also
 Coke Express
 Merry-go-round train
 Railex
 Tropicana's Juice Train

References 

Rail transport operations
Trains
Rail freight transport